William Dillwyn Sims (7 July 1825, Westminster – 7 March 1895) was an English industrialist and artist based in Ipswich. In 1851 he joined the company Ransomes and May, in which his uncle Charles May was a partner. Charles left in 1852 and the company became Ransomes and Sims. Sims remained involved in the company as it evolved into Ransomes, Sims & Jefferies.

Early life
William was the son of Dr. John Sims and Lydia Dillwyn, who were Quakers in Westminster, London. His Aunt, Ann Dillwyn married Richard Dykes Alexander, another prominent Quaker in Ipswich.

References

1825 births
1895 deaths
Artists from Ipswich
19th-century English businesspeople
English industrialists
Businesspeople from Ipswich